The effective number of parties is a concept introduced by Laakso and Taagepera (1979) which provides for an adjusted number of political parties in a country's party system.  The idea behind this measure is to count parties and, at the same time, to weight the count by their relative strength. The relative strength refers to their vote share effective number of electoral parties (ENEP) or seat share in the parliament effective number of parliamentary parties (ENPP). This measure is especially useful when comparing party systems across countries, as is done in the field of political science. The number of parties equals the effective number of parties only when all parties have equal strength. In any other case, the effective number of parties is lower than the actual number of parties. The effective number of parties is a frequent operationalization for the political fragmentation.

There are two major alternatives to the  effective number of parties-measure. John K. Wildgen's index of "hyperfractionalization" accords special weight to small parties. Juan Molinar's index gives special weight to the largest party. Dunleavy and Boucek provide a useful critique of the Molinar index.

The measure is essentially equivalent to the Herfindahl-Hirschman Index, a diversity index used in economics; the Simpson diversity index, which is a diversity index used in ecology; and the inverse participation ratio (IPR) in physics.

Formulae
According to Laakso and Taagepera (1979),  the effective number of parties is computed by the following formula:

Where n is the number of parties with at least one vote/seat and  the square of each party's proportion of all votes or seats. The proportions need to be normalised such that, for example, 50 per cent is 0.5 and 1 per cent is 0.01. This is also the formula for the inverse Simpson index, or the true diversity of order 2.

An alternative formula proposed by Golosov (2010) is

which is equivalent - if we only consider parties with at least one vote/seat - to

Values
The following table illustrates the difference between the values produced by the two formulas for eight hypothetical vote or seat constellations:

Institutional Theory

Effective number of parties by country 
For individual countries the values of effective number of number of parliamentary parties (ENPP) for the last available election is shown. 
Some of the highest effective number of parties are in Brazil, Belgium, and Bosnia and Herzegovina. European Parliament has an even higher effective number of parties if national parties are considered, yet a much lower effective number of parties if political groups of the European Parliament are considered.

References

External links
 Michael Gallagher providing data on the Laakso-Taagepera effective number of parties for over 900 elections in over 100 countries
 Average effective number of parties (Golosov) for 183 democratic party systems and non-systems, 1792–2009, reported in Golosov, Grigorii V., "Towards a Classification of the World's Democratic Party Systems, Step 1: Identifying the Units", Party Politics, Vol. 19, No. 1, January 2013, pp. 134–138.
 How to compute Golosov’s effective number of parties in Excel

Electoral systems
Political science
Political party systems